The 2021 South Tyneside Council election took place on 6 May 2021 to elect members of South Tyneside Council in England. This was on the same day as other local elections. One-third of the seats were up for election. The previous election in the area was in 2019.

Results

Ward results

Beacon and Bents

Bede

Biddick and All Saints

Boldon Colliery

Cleadon and East Boldon

Cleadon Park

Fellgate and Hedworth

Harton

Hebburn North

Hebburn South

Horsley Hill

Monkton

Primrose

Simonside and Rekendyke

West Park

Westoe

Whitburn and Marsden

Whiteleas

By-elections

Fellgate and Hedworth
Independent candidate John Robertson has previously been a councillor on South Tyneside council. In 2011, he deliberately drove a lorry into a council office building following a row over contracts. This resulted in over £160,000 in damage. He received 40 weeks in prison, was suspended from the council, and subsequently declared bankrupt.

The by-election was triggered by Robertson resigning. He was unsuccessful in attempting to retract his own resignation, so subsequently contested the by-election.

Cleadon & East Boldon

References 

South Tyneside
South Tyneside Council elections